The Constitution of Prussia, was the constitution of the Free State of Prussia. It came into effect on 30 November 1920. It was formally dissolved along with Prussia itself in 1947 though in practice it had been ineffectual since the 1932 Prussian coup d'état which established Franz von Papen as Reich commissioner of Prussia. 

It established a parliamentary system with a bicameral legislature, the Landtag of Prussia, with the Abgeordnetenhaus as the lower house and the Prussian State Council as the upper house. The executive was led by the Minister President.

External links

 Text of the Constitution 

Constitutional history of Germany
Politics of Free State of Prussia
1920 in Germany
1920 in law
Law in Weimar Republic
Prussian law